Franziska Konitz (born 24 November 1986) is a German judoka.

Achievements

External links
 

1986 births
Living people
German female judoka
European Games silver medalists for Germany
European Games medalists in judo
Judoka at the 2015 European Games
20th-century German women
21st-century German women